Robin L'Houmeau is a Canadian actor from Val-d'Or, Quebec. He is most noted for his performance in the 2020 film Goddess of the Fireflies (La déesse des mouches à feu), for which he received a Prix Iris nomination for Best Supporting Actor at the 23rd Quebec Cinema Awards in 2021.

He has also appeared in the television series Jeu and Fugueuse, and in the film Happy Face.

References

External links

21st-century Canadian male actors
Canadian male television actors
Canadian male film actors
Male actors from Quebec
French Quebecers
Living people
People from Val-d'Or
Year of birth missing (living people)